The 2012 Bayern Rundfahrt was the 33rd edition of the Bayern Rundfahrt, an annual cycling road race. Departing from Traunstein on 22 May, it concluded in Bamberg on 27 May. The 801.9 km long stage race was part of the 2012 UCI Europe Tour, and was rated as a 2.HC event. Michael Rogers of Team Sky was the eventual winner.

Teams
19 teams were invited to participate in the tour: 9 UCI ProTeams, 5 UCI Professional Continental Teams and 5 UCI Continental Teams.

Stages

Stage 1
23 May 2012 – Traunstein to Penzberg, Stage 2
24 May 2012 – Penzberg to Kempten, Stage 3
''25 May 2012 – Kempten to Treuchtlingen, 

Stage 426 May 2012 – individual time trial (ITT) in Feuchtwangen, 

Stage 527 May 2012 – Feuchtwangen to Bamberg, '''

Classification leadership

General classification

References 

Bayern
Bayern-Rundfahrt
2012 in German sport